This is a List of nuclear and radiation fatalities by country.

This list only reports the proximate confirmed human deaths and does not go into detail about ecological, environmental or long-term effects such as birth defects or permanent loss of habitable land.

Brazil
September 13, 1987 – Goiania accident. Four fatalities and 320 other people received serious radiation contamination.

Costa Rica
1996 – Radiotherapy accident in Costa Rica. Thirteen fatalities and 114 other patients received an overdose of radiation.

Greenland
January 21, 1968 – Thule accident.

India
April 2010 – Mayapuri radiological accident. One fatality.

Japan
March 1, 1954 – Daigo Fukuryū Maru, one fatality.  A Japanese tuna fishing boat with a crew of 23 men which was contaminated by nuclear fallout from the United States Castle Bravo thermonuclear weapon test at Bikini Atoll on March 1, 1954, due to miscalculation of the bomb's explosive yield.
1965 Philippine Sea A-4 crash – where a Skyhawk attack aircraft with a nuclear weapon in US-occupied Okinawa fell into the sea. The pilot, the aircraft, and the B43 nuclear bomb were never recovered. It was not until the 1980s that the Pentagon revealed the loss of the one-megaton bomb.
September 30, 1999 – Tokaimura nuclear accident, nuclear fuel reprocessing plant, two fatalities. 
August 9, 2004 – Mihama Nuclear Power Plant accident. Hot water and steam leaked from a broken pipe. The accident was the worst nuclear disaster of Japan up until that time, excluding Hiroshima and Nagasaki. Five fatalities.
March 12, 2011 – Fukushima. Level 7 nuclear accident on the INES. Three of the reactors at Fukushima I overheated, causing meltdowns that eventually led to explosions, which released large amounts of radioactive material into the environment.

Mexico
1962 – Radiation accident in Mexico City, four fatalities.

Morocco
March 1984 – Radiation accident in Morocco, eight fatalities.

Panama
August 2000 to March 2001 – Instituto Oncologico Nacional of Panama; 17 patients receiving treatment for prostate cancer and cancer of the cervix received lethal doses of radiation.

Soviet Union/Russia
September 29, 1957 – Kyshtym disaster, Mayak nuclear waste storage tank explosion at Chelyabinsk. Two hundred plus fatalities and this figure is a conservative estimate; 270,000 people were exposed to dangerous radiation levels. Over thirty small communities had been removed from Soviet maps between 1958 and 1991. (INES level 6).
July 4, 1961 – Soviet submarine K-19 accident. Eight fatalities and more than 30 people were over-exposed to radiation.
 May 24, 1968 – Soviet submarine K-27 accident. Nine fatalities and 83 people were injured.
5 October 1982 – Lost radiation source, Baku, Azerbaijan, USSR. Five fatalities and 13 injuries.   
August 10, 1985 – Soviet submarine K-431 accident. Ten fatalities and 49 other people suffered radiation injuries.
April 26, 1986 – Chernobyl disaster. See below in the section on Ukraine.  In 1986, the Ukrainian SSR was part of the Soviet Union.  
April 6, 1993 – accident at the Tomsk-7 Reprocessing Complex, when a tank exploded while being cleaned with nitric acid. The explosion released a cloud of radioactive gas (INES level 4).

Spain
January 17, 1966 – 1966 Palomares B-52 crash.
December 1990 – Radiotherapy accident in Zaragoza. Eleven fatalities and 27 other patients were injured.
April 4, 2007 – Radioactive leakage in C.N. Ascó I (Ascó - Tarragona).

Thailand
February 2000 – Three deaths and ten injuries resulted in Samut Prakarn when a radiation-therapy unit was dismantled.

Ukraine

April 26, 1986 – Chernobyl disaster. There is rough agreement that a total of either 31 or 54 people died from blast trauma or acute radiation syndrome (ARS) as a direct result of the disaster.

United Kingdom
October 8, 1957 – Windscale fire ignites plutonium piles and contaminates surrounding dairy farms, 100 to 240 cancer deaths.

United States
August 21, 1945 – Harry Daghlian died at Los Alamos National Laboratory in New Mexico. 
May 21, 1946 – Louis Slotin died. 
December 30, 1958 – Cecil Kelley criticality accident, at the Los Alamos National Laboratory.
1961 – (US Army) SL-1 accident resulted in three fatalities.
 1964- Wood River Jct. Rhode Island. Robert D. Peabody – according to the Nuclear Regulatory Commission, Robert Peabody was the U.S. nuclear industry's first and last fatality due to acute radiation syndrome.
1974-1976 – Columbus radiotherapy accident, 10 deaths and 88 injuries.
1979 – Three Mile Island Accident – resulted in the permanent shutdown and decommission of Reactor 2, no recorded radiation release; no (known) linked deaths.
1980 – Houston radiotherapy accident, 7 deaths.
 1981 – Douglas Crofut died.

See also
Atomic bombings of Hiroshima and Nagasaki
Lists of nuclear disasters and radioactive incidents
Nuclear and radiation accidents
Nuclear power accidents by country
Nevada Test Site
Radium Girls
Semipalatinsk Test Site

References

External links
 The Worst Nuclear Disasters TIME magazine
 U.S. Nuclear Accidents Compiled by allen lutins
  World Nuclear

Fatalities by country
Fatalities by country
Fatalities by country
Nuclear and radiation accidents by country